Albert Émile Clément Dorlia (7 December 1870 – 23 January 1942) was a French rower. He competed in two events at the 1900 Summer Olympics.

References

External links
 

1870 births
1942 deaths
French male rowers
Olympic rowers of France
Rowers at the 1900 Summer Olympics
Rowers from Paris